WNWN (98.5 MHz, "Win 98-5") is an FM radio station broadcasting a country music format. Licensed to Coldwater, Michigan with studios in Battle Creek, it first began broadcasting in 1950 under the WTVB-FM call sign at 98.3 on the FM dial and spent most of its early existence as a simulcast of sister station WTVB before changing to its current calls, format, and frequency.

Win 98-5 is consistently one of the top-rated radio stations in the Battle Creek market.

WNWN programming was formerly heard on translator 95.5 W238AL in Portage, allowing the station's programming to better penetrate the Kalamazoo market. The translator later simulcast WTOU.

References
Michiguide.com - WNWN History

External links
Official station website

NWN (FM)
Country radio stations in the United States
Radio stations established in 1950
1950 establishments in Michigan
Midwest Communications radio stations